The Abu Dhabi HSBC Championship is a European Tour golf tournament held in Abu Dhabi, United Arab Emirates. When founded in 2006, it was one of three European Tour events to be staged in the Arabian Peninsula, but at one point was one of six.

History
In 2019 it was elevated to be one of eight tournaments which are part of the Rolex Series, which identifies it as one of the European Tour's premier events.

With the support of sponsor HSBC and the local organiser, Abu Dhabi Tourism Authority, it has historically had one of the strongest fields on the European Tour due to "promotional" money paid to top golfers.

A change of venue was announced for the 2022 event, with the tournament being played at Yas Links, Abu Dhabi, located on Yas Island. From 2006 to 2021 the tournament had been hosted at Abu Dhabi Golf Club.

Winners

References

External links
Coverage on the European Tour's official site

European Tour events
Golf tournaments in the United Arab Emirates
Sports competitions in Abu Dhabi
Recurring sporting events established in 2006
2006 establishments in the United Arab Emirates
Winter events in the United Arab Emirates